Chandmari is a village in the town of Doiwala, in Dehradun district in the state of Uttarakhand, India. In the past it was a shooting range for the army and housed the local Ahmed satellite station, which is important to the region for its role in being the second oldest satellite station in the country. Despite the low population and a highly forested land, the village is important due to its accelerated urbanization, situation on the border with Rajaji National Park, its closeness to both the railway station, the nearby Picnic Spot at Lachhiwala and local Doiwala landmarks like the Rambagh house, which lends its name to the Rambagh colony, situated opposite the estate (supposedly the pukka house - local lingo for modern cement and concrete structures - has been around for three quarters of a century - with a more primitive building having existed decades before that).

References

Villages in Dehradun district